Carlos Jiménez (born 27 July 1954) is a Costa Rican former footballer. He competed in the men's tournament at the 1980 Summer Olympics.

References

External links
 
 

1954 births
Living people
Costa Rican footballers
Costa Rica international footballers
Olympic footballers of Costa Rica
Footballers at the 1980 Summer Olympics
Place of birth missing (living people)
Association football defenders
C.S. Cartaginés players